Pierre Barthès (born 13 September 1941) is a retired French tennis player.

Career
Born in Béziers, Barthès was one of the Handsome Eight, a group of players signed by Lamar Hunt in 1968 for the newly formed professional World Championship Tennis (WCT) group. In 1974, he reached a career-high ATP singles ranking of world No. 54, though this is not a true indication, as he was one of the top 20 players in 1971 before the creation of the ATP ranking system, making the year-end Masters the same year. He was also a US Open doubles champion in 1970, partnering Nikola Pilić.

Grand Slam finals

Doubles: 1 (1 title)

References

External links
 
 
 

French male tennis players
Sportspeople from Béziers
US Open (tennis) champions
1941 births
Living people
Grand Slam (tennis) champions in men's doubles
Professional tennis players before the Open Era